Escoto is a surname. Notable people with the surname include:

Alberto Escoto (born 1925), Cuban basketball player
Juan Escoto (1894–1975), Mexican writer and politician
Julio Escoto (born 1944), Honduran writer
Nazario Escoto, Nicaraguan politician and President of Nicaragua